The county of North Yorkshire,
together with the unitary authority of York, is divided into 8 parliamentary constituencies: one borough constituency
and 7 county constituencies.

Constituencies

2010 boundary changes
Under the Fifth Periodic Review of Westminster constituencies, the Boundary Commission for England decided that North Yorkshire should continue to be divided into 8 constituencies for the 2010 general election, but the boundaries were extensively redrawn in the south-eastern part to accommodate exactly two seats wholly within the recently formed unitary authority of York. The Vale of York was abolished and a new constituency named York Outer created, with City of York being renamed York Central. Ryedale was succeeded by Thirsk and Malton, and Selby was renamed Selby and Ainsty.

Proposed boundary changes 
See 2023 Periodic Review of Westminster constituencies for further details.

Following the abandonment of the Sixth Periodic Review (the 2018 review), the Boundary Commission for England formally launched the 2023 Review on 5 January 2021. Initial proposals were published on 8 June 2021 and, following two periods of public consultation, revised proposals were published on 8 November 2022. Final proposals will be published by 1 July 2023.

The commission has proposed that North Yorkshire be combined with West Yorkshire as a sub-region of the Yorkshire and the Humber Region, resulting in the creation of two new cross-county boundary constituencies: Selby which comprises the majority of the abolished constituency of Selby and Ainsty and includes the City of Leeds ward of Kippax and Methley; and a new constituency named Wetherby and Easingwold which includes the City of Leeds wards of Harewood and Weatherby. It is proposed that Richmond (Yorks) is renamed Richmond and Northallerton.

The following constituencies are proposed:

Containing electoral wards from Craven

 Skipton and Ripon (part) 

Containing electoral wards from Hambleton

 Richmond and Northallerton (part)
 Thirsk and Malton (part)
 Weatherby and Easingwold (part)1

Containing electoral wards from Harrogate

 Harrogate and Knaresborough
 Skipton and Ripon (part)
 Weatherby and Easingwold (part)1

Containing electoral wards from Richmondshire

 Richmond and Northallerton (part)

Containing electoral wards from Ryedale

 Thirsk and Malton (part)

Containing electoral wards from Scarborough

 Scarborough and Whitby
 Thirsk and Malton CC (part)

Containing electoral wards from Selby

 Selby (part also in the City of Leeds in West Yorkshire)
 Weatherby and Easingwold (part)1

Containing electoral wards from York

 York Central
 York Outer

1 also contains parts in the City of Leeds in West Yorkshire

Results history
Primary data source: House of Commons research briefing - General election results from 1918 to 2019

2019 
The number of votes cast for each political party who fielded candidates in constituencies comprising North Yorkshire in the 2019 general election were as follows:

Percentage votes 

11983 & 1987 - SDP-Liberal Alliance

* Included in Other

Seats 

11983 & 1987 - SDP-Liberal Alliance

Maps

Historical representation by party
Data given here is for the North Riding of Yorkshire until 1983, and includes the city of York throughout. A cell marked → (with a different colour background to the preceding cell) indicates that the previous MP continued to sit under a new party name.

1885 to 1918

1918 to 1950

1950 to 1983

1983 to present

See also
 List of parliamentary constituencies in Yorkshire and the Humber
 List of parliamentary constituencies in Cleveland for those covering Middlesbrough, Redcar and Cleveland and Stockton-on-Tees in the ceremonial county of North Yorkshire.

Notes

References

 
Yorkshire, North
Politics of North Yorkshire
Parliamentary constituencies